James M. Anderson served as the president and chief executive officer at Cincinnati Children's Hospital Medical Center from 1996 to 2009.  He was also chairman of the board of the Cincinnati Branch of the Federal Reserve Bank of Cleveland. In July 2005, Anderson was appointed to a national advisory commission on Medicaid reform, while two years earlier, he was appointed to Ohio Governor Bob Taft's Third Frontier Advisory Board.

Anderson is a former mayor of The Village of Indian Hill, Ohio, and is a graduate of Yale University (1963) and Vanderbilt University Law School (1966). He was a captain in the U.S. Army (1966–1968) during the Vietnam War.

References

Year of birth missing (living people)
Living people
Politicians from Cincinnati
United States Army officers
Vanderbilt University Law School alumni
Yale University alumni
Mayors of places in Ohio
American health care chief executives